The Ed Forest is a forest separating the Norwegian county of Hedmark from the Swedish province of Värmland. Today, this area exists as two communes: the Norwegian Eidskog and the Swedish Eda. Snorri Sturlusson called this area Eidskogen. It is best known for its road of pilgrimage, Eskoleia, leading to the cathedral of Nidaros in Trondheim.

Forests of Sweden
Geography of Värmland County